Honeymoon is an Indian Kannada-language romantic comedy series created and produced by Sakkath Studios and it premiered on Voot. Series is first venture of Shiva Rajkumar's production house Shree Muthu Cine Services. Actor Nagabhushana co-wrote the series and features in the lead in the series with Sanjana Anand. The series tells the story of a newly-wed couple, on their honeymoon in Kerala. Series completed in 2019 and released the Telugu dubbed in version in aha while Original Kannada version released on Voot Select on 20 May 2022.

Cast
 Nagabhushana as Praveen 
 Sanjana Anand as Tejaswini 
 Pawan Kumar as new Friend in Bar
 Vasuki Vaibhav as Photographer 
 Anand Ninasam as Tejaswini's uncle
 Mahadev as Travel agent 
 Apoorva Bharadwaj as Daisy
 Poorna Mysore as Tejaswini's friend
 Karthik as Taxi driver
 Archana Kotige as Jyothi

Episodes

Productions
Kannada veteran actor Shiva Rajkumar started Shree Muthu Cine Services with his daughter Niveditha Shivrajkumar  suggestion for making content based  Kannada web series.

Niveditha Shivrajkumar joined hands with RJ Pradeep from Sakkath Studios to make new webseries. Initially decided that series will be directed Vikram Yoganand, director of ‘Dr PAL’ web series and ‘Heengondu Dina’ movie. Production house decided to name series as "Honeymoon" with seven episodes but later decide to make six episodes series.

Series is written by Nagabhushana, an actor who is mostly known for his humour sketches on YouTube. In addition to the writing, Nagabhushana also plays the lead character in the series. Sanjana Anand selected to plays the female lead, who debuted in 2019 Kannada film Chemistry of Kariyappa.

First phase of shooting done in Bengaluru, while the second is likely to be held in an interesting locality. The production house has roped in Vasuki Vaibhav to score music and Rahul Roy for cinematography. Later hired Shreesha Kuduvalli as additional cinematographer.

Most of the shooting done in Alleppey, Kerala. Shooting completed in June 2019. According to the production house, Honey Moon is the first webseries to be shot in Kerala.

Release
Series trailer released on 12 May 2022 by Dr. Shiva Rajkumar. Announces series will releases on 20 May 2022 in Voot Select.

The six episode first season premiered on 20 May 2022 on Voot.
Telugu dubbed version released on 27 November 2020 in aha. while Original Kannada version delayed several times and finally released on 20 May 2022.

References

External links
 

2022 Indian television series debuts
Indian drama web series